The String Quartet No. 1 in A minor by Hungarian composer Béla Bartók was completed in 1909. The score is dated January 27 of that year. It is one of six string quartets by Bartok.

The work is in three movements, played without breaks between each:

The work was at least in part inspired by Bartók's unrequited love for the violinist Stefi Geyer - in a letter to her, he called the first movement a "funeral dirge" and its opening notes trace a motif which first appeared in his Violin Concerto No. 1, a work dedicated to Geyer and suppressed by Bartók for many years. The intense contrapuntal writing of this movement is often compared to Ludwig van Beethoven's String Quartet No. 14, Op. 131, the opening movement of which is a slow fugue.

The following two movements are progressively faster, and the mood of the work lightens considerably, ending quite happily. The third movement is generally considered to be the most typical of Bartók's mature style, including early  evidence of his interest in Hungarian folk music.

The piece was premiered on 19 March 1910 in Budapest by the Waldbauer-Kerpely Quartet, two days after Bartók played the piano with them in a concert dedicated to the music of Zoltán Kodály. It was first published in 1911 in Hungary.

Discography

References

External links
 
 
 Performance by the Belcea Quartet from the Isabella Stewart Gardner Museum in MP3 format

1
1909 compositions
Compositions in A minor